General elections were held in Liberia in 1939. It was the first presidential election since 1931, as special legislation approved by a referendum in 1935 had extended Edwin Barclay's term from four to eight years. Barclay, a member of the True Whig Party, was the only candidate, and was re-elected unopposed.

References

Liberia
1939 in Liberia
Elections in Liberia
Single-candidate elections
Election and referendum articles with incomplete results